On 7 October 2019, a suicide bomber detonated an improvised explosive device in a rickshaw in Jalalabad as a minibus carrying Afghan Army recruits passed it. At least fourteen people were killed and 37 others were injured.

References 

2019 murders in Afghanistan
2019 suicide bombing
21st-century mass murder in Afghanistan
Bus bombings in Asia
2019 suicide bombing
2019 suicide bombing
Mass murder in 2019
October 2019 crimes in Asia
October 2019 events in Afghanistan
Suicide bombings in 2019
Suicide bombings in Afghanistan
Terrorist incidents in Afghanistan in 2019